This page is a list of pages listing corporate headquarters and corporations headquartered in particular cities.

Canada

 Moncton, New Brunswick
 Winnipeg, Manitoba

Hong Kong and Macau

 Hong Kong
 Macau

India

 Gurgaon, Haryana
 Hyderabad, Telangana
 Bangalore, karnataka

United Kingdom

 Bradford, West Yorkshire
 Greater Manchester
 Harrogate, North Yorkshire
 Leeds, West Yorkshire
 London
 Sheffield, South Yorkshire
 Sunderland, Tyne and Wear

United States

 Amarillo, Texas
 Austin, Texas
 Atlanta, Georgia (metropolitan area)
 Birmingham, Alabama
 Boston, Massachusetts
 Charlotte, North Carolina
 Chicago, Illinois (metropolitan area)
 Cincinnati, Ohio (metropolitan area)
 Dallas, Texas (metropolitan area)
 Denver, Colorado (metropolitan area)
 Harrisburg, Lancaster, and York, Pennsylvania
 Houston, Texas
 Jacksonville, Florida (metropolitan area)
 Kansas City, Missouri (metropolitan area)
 Kirkland, Washington
 Lansing, Michigan
 Los Angeles, California
 Minneapolis–St. Paul, Minnesota (metropolitan area)
 New York, New York
 Northern Virginia
 Oklahoma City, Oklahoma
 Philadelphia, Pennsylvania (metropolitan area)
 Phoenix, Arizona
 Pittsburgh, Pennsylvania
 St. Louis, Missouri
 San Diego, California
 San Francisco, California
 Seattle, Washington
 Tulsa, Oklahoma

Elsewhere

 Campinas, São Paulo, Brazil
 Paris, France
 Singapore

See also

 Lists of companies

Headquarters by city, List of corporate
Lists of headquarters
Lists of buildings and structures by city